Health and intelligence may refer to:

 Impact of health on intelligence, research findings on how health deficiencies and medical and nutritional interventions influence intelligence test scores
 Cognitive epidemiology, a field of research investigating how intelligence measured at an early age predicts later morbidity and mortality outcomes